Kanchi is a Bangladeshi film actress.

She acted in Anondo Osru in 1997 where Salman Shah was her co-star. She also acted in Prithibi Amare Chai Na in 1996 which was the first film of Ferdous Ahmed as hero.

Selected filmography
 Anondo Osru
 Prithibi Amare Chai Na
 Tumi Shudhu Tumi
 Mrityo Koto Voyonkor
 Demag
  ''Shesh Thikana' '<ref>

References

Living people
Bangladeshi film actresses
Year of birth missing (living people)